William G. Anagnos (August 19, 1958 – January 15, 2019) was an American stuntman and actor.

Early life 
Bill Anagnos was born on August 19, 1958, in Rhinebeck, New York. At the age of 16, Anagnos toured with the Joie Chitwood Thrill Show as a motorcycle stunt rider.

Film career
His first job was doubling John Travolta in the film Saturday Night Fever (1977)  Anagnos appeared in hundreds of films, commercials, and television shows, doubling for and working with prominent actors and actresses, including Paul Newman, Patrick Swayze, Robin Williams, Robert Downey, Jr., Farrah Fawcett, Angelina Jolie, and others.

He also acted in several films.

Filmography
Actor

References

External links 

1958 births
2019 deaths
20th-century American male actors
21st-century American male actors
American male film actors
 American male television actors
American stunt performers
Male actors from New York (state)
People from Rhinebeck, New York